Michael P. Nash is an American film director, screenwriter and producer. He has directed the films Climate Refugees, Fuel and Nebraska. His films have won several domestic and international awards. During the Copenhagen COP15 conference Nash, considered an expert on environmental migration, helped the UN frame the issue of environmental migrants. At the 2010 Sundance Film Festival, where his film Climate Refugees was shown, Robert Redford stated that "[Climate Refugees] can be an agent for social change." Climate Refugees was also shown at the L.A. Film Festival and was screened by the United Nations. Recently he was award Senator Barbara Boxer's Conservation Champion Award and the Neiman Marcus Environmental Filmmakers Vision Award at the Dallas International Film Festival.

References

External links
Climate Refugees
ABC News interview

Living people
American documentary film directors
People from Fort Pierce, Florida
Film directors from Florida
Year of birth missing (living people)